Incilius epioticus (common name: Cerro Utyum toad) is a species of toad in the family Bufonidae. It is found on the Atlantic versant of the Cordillera de Talamanca in south-eastern Costa Rica and north-eastern Panama.
Its natural habitats are primary and mature secondary forests, cloud forests, and highland oak forests. It is diurnal and found over dead leaves on the forest floor.

References

epioticus
Amphibians of Costa Rica
Amphibians of Panama
Amphibians described in 1875
Taxonomy articles created by Polbot